The Valle del Belice is the valley of the Belice river, in south-western Sicily, Italy. It lies in the provinces of Agrigento, Palermo and Trapani.

1968 earthquake

The valley was struck by an earthquake in January 1968; in 2012 the damage had still not been fully repaired.

Agriculture
The Valle del Belice breed of domestic sheep originates in the valley. Agricultural products of the area include the D.O.P. Vastedda della valle del Belìce, a pecorino (sheep's milk) cheese, and "Valle del Belìce DOP" extra-virgin olive oil, made from a minimum of 70% Nocellara del Belice olives. Nocellara del Belice table olives also have DOP status.

References

Valleys of Italy
Province of Palermo
Province of Trapani
Province of Agrigento